Hugo Hildebrand Hildebrandsson (19 August 1838 – 29 July 1925) was a Swedish meteorologist and professor at Uppsala university between 1878 and 1907.

Biography
Hildebrandsson was born in Stockholm, and educated at the Stockholm gymnasium and the university of Upsala, where he took his doctor's degree in 1858, becoming doctor of physics in 1866. In 1878, he was appointed first professor of meteorology at Upsala and director of the meteorological observatory there. He retained these posts until 1906. He was a prominent member of the International Meteorological Committee, and for some years served as its secretary. In 1880, he was elected an honorary fellow of the Royal Meteorological Society of London, which in 1920 awarded him the Symons Gold Medal. He was also a member of many other foreign scientific societies.

As a meteorologist, Hildebrandsson is notable for his researches into the subject of clouds. He denominated a new sort of cloud—Cumulus Cloud. In 1880, he was requested by the International Meteorological Committee to prepare the International Cloud Atlas, a work carried out in conjunction with Leon Teisserenc de Bort. Many further observations were subsequently incorporated in Les bases de la météorologie dynamique (1907), in which Teisserenc de Bort again collaborated. His papers on centers of action of the atmosphere marked a great advance in seasonal forecasts.

In 1888, he was elected a member of the Royal Swedish Academy of Sciences, and he was also a member of the Nobel Committee for Physics.
In 1897, Hildebrandsson was the first to scientifically postulate the connection between Asian weather anomalies and the tropical Pacific El Nino. (NOAA, 2011)

Photos from «On the classification of clouds used at the Upsala meteorological observatory» by  H.H. Hildebrandsson. 1879

Notes

References

This article incorporates information from the corresponding Swedish Wikipedia article as of 28 July 2009.
NOAA (2011). El Niño. ed. C. Michael Hogan. Encyclopedia of Earth. National Council for Science and Environment. Washington DC. Retrieved from http://editors.eol.org/eoearth/wiki/El_Niño

Swedish meteorologists
Academic staff of Uppsala University
Members of the Royal Swedish Academy of Sciences
1838 births
1925 deaths
Burials at Uppsala old cemetery